Nico Denz (born 15 February 1994) is a German professional racing cyclist, who currently rides for UCI WorldTeam . He competed in the 2017 Vuelta a España, his first Grand Tour. In May 2018, he competed in the 2018 Giro d'Italia, and has entered the race each year since.

Major results

2011
 3rd Road race, National Junior Road Championships
2015
 3rd Road race, National Under-23 Road Championships
 7th Overall Tour des Pays de Savoie
 8th Tour de Berne
2016
 4th Cholet-Pays de Loire
2017
 1st  Mountains classification, Étoile de Bessèges
2018
 1st Tour de Vendée
 8th Le Samyn
 9th Road race, UEC European Road Championships
2020
 2nd Overall Okolo Slovenska
1st Stage 2
2022
 1st Stage 6 Tour de Suisse

Grand Tour general classification results timeline

References

External links

 
 

1994 births
Living people
German male cyclists
People from Waldshut-Tiengen
Sportspeople from Freiburg (region)
European Games competitors for Germany
Cyclists at the 2019 European Games
Cyclists from Baden-Württemberg
Tour de Suisse stage winners